The Lockheed JetStar (company designations L-329 and L-1329; designated C-140 in US military service) is a business jet produced from the early 1960s to the 1970s. The JetStar was the first dedicated business jet to enter service, as well as the only such airplane built by Lockheed. It was also one of the largest aircraft in the class for many years, seating ten plus two crew. It is distinguishable from other small jets by its four engines, mounted on the rear of the fuselage, and the "slipper"-style fuel tanks fixed to the wings.

Development

The JetStar originated as a private project within Lockheed, with an eye to winning a United States Air Force (USAF) requirement that was later dropped due to budget cuts. Lockheed decided to continue the project on its own for the business market.

The first two prototypes were equipped with two Bristol Siddeley Orpheus engines, the first of these flying on 4 September 1957. The second of these was also equipped with the wing-mounted "slipper tanks", which was originally to be an option. Lockheed attempted to arrange a contract to produce the Orpheus in the US, but when these negotiations failed it re-engined the second prototype with four Pratt & Whitney JT12s in 1959. The outer engines were mounted beside the inner ones, an arrangement that was later used on the Vickers VC10 and Ilyushin Il-62 airliners. The slipper tanks were removed and placed on the first prototype. The JT12 fit proved successful and was selected for the production versions, the first of which flew in mid 1960. These versions entered commercial service in 1961.

Noise regulations in the United States and high fuel consumption led to the development of the 731 JetStar, a modification program which added new Garrett TFE731 turbofan engines with a number of detail changes. It has redesigned larger external fuel tanks that sit with their upper surfaces flush with the wing, rather than being centered on it. The cockpit area has a somewhat more "modern" looking nose and window arrangement. The 731 JetStar modification program was so successful that Lockheed produced 40 new JetStars, designated the JetStar II, from 1976 to 1979. The JetStar IIs were factory-new aircraft with the turbofan engines and revised external fuel tanks. Both 731 JetStars and JetStar IIs have greatly increased range, reduced noise, and better runway performance compared to the original JetStars.

JetStar production totaled 204 aircraft by final delivery in 1978. Most original JetStars have been retired, but many 731 JetStars and JetStar IIs are still flying in various roles, mainly as corporate and private jets.

Design

The JetStar has a fairly typical business jet design layout, with a swept wing and a cruciform tail. The wing has a 30° sweepback and features large fuel tanks at about half-span, extending some distance in front and behind the wing. The wings hold 10,000 pounds of fuel, and each slipper tank holds 4,000 pounds of fuel for a total fuel load of 18,000 pounds. The wing also includes leading edge flaps (not slats) along the front of the wing outboard of the tanks (these leading edge flaps reduce the stalling speed by an additional three knots), while double-slotted trailing edge flaps span the entire rear surface inboard of the ailerons. The wing incorporates inflatable rubber deicing boots for the removal of ice accumulated in flight. The horizontal stabilizer is mounted nearly halfway up the fin to keep it clear of the engines' jet blast. One feature is that the horizontal stabilizer is trimmable by pivoting the entire tail fin and stabilizer assembly, which has a distinctive unpainted area at the base of the fin that is noticeable in most pictures. The JetStar does not have any tail deicing capability, nor was it required for certification. A speed brake is located on the underside of the fuselage to aid deceleration for landing. The original prototypes used a tricycle landing gear with one wheel per leg, but after an accident in 1962 the nose gear was modified with two tires.

The JetStar is a relatively heavy aircraft for its class, at 44,500 lb (19,278 kg). Maximum cruising speed is Mach 0.8, or 567 mph (912 km/h) at 21,000 ft (6,401 m). Range is typically quoted as 2,500 mi (4,023 km) with a 3,500 lb (1,588 kg) payload. Typically, interiors feature seating for eight with a full-sized lavatory, or a slightly denser arrangement for ten. The JetStar is one of the few aircraft of its class which allow a person to walk upright in the cabin, although to do this the aisle is sunk slightly so that the seats are raised on either side. The windows are relatively large.

Operational history
The first prototype served as the personal transport of Lockheed's Vice President of Advanced Development Projects Kelly Johnson for some time. Elvis Presley owned two JetStars at different times; the second was named Hound Dog II and is on display at Graceland. Frank Sinatra also owned one. Additionally, one JetStar belonged to U.S. President Richard Nixon, then to the Shah of Iran and finally, to Puerto Rican boy band Menudo.

Sixteen JetStars were produced for the USAF; five C-140As were flight inspection aircraft for the Air Force Communications Service and were used to perform airborne testing of airport navigational aids (navaids) from 1962 onwards. They began service during the Vietnam War and remained in service until the early 1990s. The "Flight Check" C-140As were combat-coded aircraft that could be distinguished from the VIP transport version by their distinctive paint scheme. The C-140As were deployed to southeast Asia during the Vietnam War, where, in addition to their more usual navaid testing, they would loiter off the coast and act as communications relays between the Pentagon and the battlefield. The last C-140A to be retired was placed on static display at Scott AFB, Illinois.

An additional eleven airframes were designated C-140B, although the first of these predated the C-140As when it was delivered in 1961. The C-140Bs were used to transport personnel by the Military Airlift Command. Six of the aircraft (tail numbers 61-2488, 61-2489, 61-2490, 61-2491, 61-2492 and 61-2493) were operated as VIP transports by the 89th Military Airlift Wing at Andrews Air Force Base. These VIP aircraft were designated as VC-140Bs. During the presidency of Jimmy Carter, he used a dedicated VC-140B extensively for short trips and it was known within the Special Air Missions Wing as "Peanut One." Upon retirement, one airframe (#89001) was placed on a static pedestal in front of the Joint Base Andrews air terminal. Members of the VIP transport fleet occasionally served as Air Force One during the 1970s and 1980s. Several other countries, such as Germany and Canada, have used military JetStars as transports for their heads of state, heads of government, and other VIPs.

The last operational JetStar (N313JS) was retired in December 2019 and preserved in Marietta. However, in November 2020, a Jetstar II (N700RM) was flown from Texas to Oregon. That particular aircraft will be disassembled in Klamath Falls. In December 2020, another Jetstar II (N710RM) was also ferried from Conroe, Texas to Klamath Falls, Oregon.

Variants
JetStar I
Business, executive transport aircraft, with accommodation for a crew of two and ten passengers, powered by four 3,300 lbf (14.7 kN) thrust Pratt & Whitney JT12A-8 turbojet engines.
JetStar II
New production version, powered by four 3,700 lbf (16.5 kN) thrust Garrett TFE731-3 turbofan engines, and fitted with revised external fuel tanks, 40 built.
JetStar 731
Modified version, fitted with four Garrett TFE731-1 turbofan engines, and equipped with redesigned external fuel tanks.
C-140A
Flight inspection aircraft for the US Air Force, similar to the JetStar I, five built.
C-140B
Passenger, cargo transport aircraft for the US Air Force, similar to the C-140A, five built.
VC-140B
VIP transport aircraft for the US Air Force, similar to the C-140B, six built.
C-140C
Two JetStar 6s were ordered by the United States Navy, originally designated UV-1, but not delivered.
T-40
US military designation for a proposed trainer version of the C-140 for evaluation, not built.
AAI FanStar
Conversion by American Aviation Industries with two General Electric CF34 engines in place of the four JT12 turbojets or TFE731 turbofans which first flew on 5 September 1986. Only one aircraft was converted. The work on the interior of the demonstrator was the subject of litigation in federal court in the late 1980s and early 1990s.

Operators

Civil operators

Algeria
 Air Algérie
Iraq
 Iraqi Airways
Mexico
 TAESA
Puerto Rico
 Menudo
United States
 Eastern Airlines
 Great Northern Railway registration N968GN, re-registered as N968BN and N7954S.
 Elvis Presley (this JetStar is currently on static display in Graceland in Memphis, TN)
 Southern Air Transport
 Trans World Airlines (TWA)

Military and government operators

Canada
 Transport Canada  former operator
West Germany
 German Air Force former operator
Indonesia
Indonesian Air Force former operator
Iran
 Islamic Republic of Iran Air Force
Iraq
 Iraqi Government
Kuwait
 Kuwait Government
Libya
 Libyan Arab Air Force
 Libyan Government
Mexico
 Mexican Air Force
Saudi Arabia
 Royal Saudi Air Force
United States
 Federal Aviation Administration (FAA)
 National Aeronautics and Space Administration (NASA)
 United States Air Force (USAF)

Accidents and incidents
On January 5, 1995 an Islamic Republic of Iran Air Force (IRIAF) JetStar crashed during an emergency landing, killing all 12 on board including General Mansour Sattari, commander of the IRIAF.

Aircraft on display

Canada
C-FDTX (c/n 5018) L-1329 Jetstar 6 – The Canada Aviation and Space Museum in Ottawa, has an L-1329 Jetstar 6 that the Department of Transport used to carry government officials and foreign dignitaries.
C-FDTF (c/n 5088) L-1329 Jetstar 6 – The Atlantic Canada Aviation Museum has a Jetstar that was used by the Canadian Prime Minister and other government officials.

Indonesia

A-9446 (c/n 5046) L-1329 Jetstar 6 – Used as VIP aircraft of Indonesian government, nicknamed "Sapta Marga". On display at Garuda Indonesia Training Centre (GITC) in Duri Kosambi, Cengkareng
A-1645 (c/n 5059) L-1329 Jetstar 6 – Used as VIP aircraft of Indonesian government, nicknamed "Pancasila". On display at Dirgantara Mandala Museum in Yogyakarta

Mexico
3908 (c/n 5144) L-1329 Jetstar 8 - On display at the Museo Militar de Aviación at Santa Lucía Air Force Base.

United Kingdom
N25AG (c/n 5202) L-1329-25 JetStar II - fuselage preserved for guest accommodations at Apple Camping in Redberth, Pembrokeshire, Wales.

United States
N329J (c/n 1001) L-1329 JetStar – The prototype JetStar is undergoing restoration at the Museum of Flight's Restoration Center in Everett, Washington. This aircraft is one of only two JetStars with only two engines.
N711Z (c/n 1002) L-1329 JetStar - On pylon display in false USAF marking as 89-001 near Base Operations and the AMC Air Terminal at Andrews AFB, Maryland.
N814NA (c/n 5003) L-1329 JetStar 6 - Former NASA JetStar is on display at the Joe Davies Heritage Park, Palmdale, California.
N777EP (c/n 5004) L-1329 JetStar 6 - Owned by Elvis Presley in his later years and named Hound Dog II, on display at Graceland, Memphis Tennessee. This is one of two Jetstars owned by Elvis Presley and/or his family.
59-5958 (c/n 5010) C-140A - Displayed at the Travis Air Force Base Heritage Center in Fairfield, California.
61-2488 (c/n 5017) VC-140B – The Museum of Aviation next to Robins Air Force Base has a VC-140B on display.
61-2489 (c/n 5022) VC-140B – Pima Air and Space Museum, adjacent to Davis-Monthan AFB in Tucson, Arizona.
61-2490 (c/n 5024) VC-140B - President Lyndon Johnson's JetStar is on display at the Lyndon B. Johnson National Historical Park.
59-5959 (c/n 5026) C-140A - In the Scott Field Heritage Air Park at Scott AFB, Illinois.
61-2492 (c/n 5031) VC-140B - In the Presidential Aircraft collection of the National Museum of the United States Air Force, Wright-Patterson AFB, Ohio.
59-5962 (c/n 5032) C-140A - Preserved at Edwards Air Force Base in Edwards, California.
62-4197 (c/n 5041) C-140B - Pima Air and Space Museum, adjacent to Davis-Monthan AFB in Tucson, Arizona. Aircraft has been given an artistic paintjob, named "Spy Tiger" by artist Andrew Schoultz.
62-4200 (c/n 5044) C-140B - Pima Air and Space Museum, adjacent to Davis-Monthan AFB in Tucson, Arizona. Aircraft has been given an artistic paintjob, named "Back to Supersonica" by artist Kenny Scharf.
62-4201 (c/n 5045) C-140B - Hill Aerospace Museum, Hill Air Force Base, Ogden, Utah, this was confirmed by former members of the 89th SAM from Andrews Air Force Base to have carried President Johnson and his wife.
N428DA (c/n 5058) L-1329 JetStar 8 - On display at the Aviation History and Technology Center adjacent to Dobbins Air Reserve Base in Marietta, Georgia.
N313JS (c/n 5086) L-1329 JetStar 731 - Preserved for display at the Aviation History and Technology Center adjacent to Dobbins Air Reserve Base in Marietta, Georgia.
N33SJ (c/n 5087) L-1329 JetStar 731 - Forward fuselage preserved at the Planes of Fame Museum in Chino, California. Painted in false US Air Force colors.
N511TD (c/n 5145) L-1329 JetStar 8 - On display at the Greater Saint Louis Air & Space Museum, Cahokia, Illinois.
XB-DUH (c/n 5157) L-1329 JetStar 8 - At the entrance to Dodson International Parts in Rantoul, Kansas with false registration N001DI.
N175MD (c/n 5215) L-1329-25 JetStar II – The Miami Auto Museum in North Miami, Florida has a complete JetStar on display inside the museum.
N377SA (c/n 5229) L-1329-25 JetStar II - On display at the Pacific Coast Air Museum in Santa Rosa, California.
N77C (c/n 5232) L-1329-25 JetStar II - On display at the TWA Museum at Charles B. Wheeler Downtown Airport, Kansas City, Missouri.

Specifications (JetStar II)

Notable appearances in media

See also

References

Notes

Bibliography

 Francillon, René J. Lockheed Aircraft since 1913. London:Putnam, 1982. .
 

 Taylor, John W.R. (ed) Jane's All the World's Aircraft 1989–90. London:Jane's Yearbooks, 1989. 

JetStar
1950s United States business aircraft
Quadjets
Low-wing aircraft
Cruciform tail aircraft
Aircraft first flown in 1957